Buckton may refer to:

Places
 Buckton, East Riding of Yorkshire, a village in the East Riding of Yorkshire, England
 Buckton, Herefordshire, a hamlet in Buckton and Coxall civil parish, England
 Buckton, Northumberland, a village in Northumberland, England
 Buckton Castle, a medieval ringwork in Greater Manchester, England

People
 George Bowdler Buckton (1818–1905), English entomologist
 John Buckton (born December 22, 1961), English rugby player
 Sir Peter Buckton (1350–1414), English politician
 Ray Buckton (1922–1995), English trade-union official
 Thomas Buckton (1858-1933), Anglican Archdeacon 
 Edward Buckton Lamb (1806–1869), English architect 
 William Buckton Andrews (1829–1918), Anglican clergyman 
 Samuel Storey, Baron Buckton (1896–1978), English Conservative politician

Fictional characters
 Charlie Buckton, a character in the Australian soap opera Home and Away
 Ruby Buckton, a character in the Australian soap opera Home and Away